"Forever My Lady" is a song by American R&B group Jodeci from their debut album of the same name (1991). The song was the second single released in promotion for the album in August 1991.  "Forever My Lady" was the first of five number one R&B hits for the group, spending two weeks at number one on the US R&B chart and also peaked at number 25 on the Billboard Hot 100.
It was written and produced by member DeVante Swing and singer/producer Al B. Sure!. The song was dedicated to Al B. Sure!'s then girlfriend Kim Porter, as well as their newborn son Quincy.

Track listing
12"
"Forever My Lady" (Radio Edit) - 4:20
"Forever My Lady" (Funky Version)
"Gotta Love" (Hip Hop)

Personnel
Information taken from Discogs.
production: Al B. Sure!, DeVante Swing
remixing: DeVante Swing
writing: Al B. Sure!, DeVante Swing, K-Ci
K-Ci Hailey - Lead and Background vocals
JoJo Hailey - Lead and Background vocals
DeVante Swing - Background vocals
Mr. Dalvin - Background vocals

Chart performance

See also
List of number-one R&B singles of 1991 (U.S.)

Notes

1991 singles
1991 songs
Jodeci songs
Uptown Records singles
Song recordings produced by DeVante Swing
Songs written by DeVante Swing
Songs written by Al B. Sure!
Contemporary R&B ballads
Soul ballads
1990s ballads